Viktor Fedorovych Mykyta (born in 1979), is a Ukrainian statesman, and activist who is currently Governor of Zakarpattia Oblast since 10 December 2021. He is a colonel of the SBU.

Biography

Viktor Mykyta was born in 1979 in the village of Ilnytsya, Irshavsky (now Khust district), in Zakarpattia Oblast.

In 1998, he graduated from the Zakarpattia Forestry Technical School with a degree in technologist-economist.

Since 1999, he worked at a number of enterprises, including Ukrposhta.

In 2002, he graduated from the National Academy of Internal Affairs of Ukraine with a degree in law.

Since 2003 he worked in law enforcement agencies in various positions, was a lawyer in a private company and deputy head of the SBU department in the Zaporozhzhia Oblast, worked in the central office of the Security Service of Ukraine.

On 10 December 2021, by decree of the President of Ukraine Volodymyr Zelenskyy, Mykyta was appointed Governor of Zakarpattia Oblast.

References

1979 births
Living people
Ukrainian colonels
Security Service of Ukraine officers
Governors of Zakarpattia Oblast